The 1969 Bucknell Bison football team was an American football team that represented Bucknell University during the 1969 NCAA College Division football season. Bucknell placed third in the Middle Atlantic Conference, University Division.

In their first year under head coach Fred Prender, the Bison compiled a 3–5–1 record. Randy Ruger and Dave Vassar were the team captains.

With a 3–2–1 record against MAC University Division opponents, the Bison narrowly missed second place in the division, finishing half a game behind 4–2 .

Bucknell played its home games at Memorial Stadium on the university campus in Lewisburg, Pennsylvania.

Schedule

References

Bucknell
Bucknell Bison football seasons
Bucknell Bison football